"The Frozen Logger" is an American folk song, written by James Stevens.  It is a tall tale song which makes reference to a logger being identifiable by the habit of stirring coffee with his thumb.

Renditions
The song has been recorded and/or performed by several musicians:
  The Weavers 1951
  Odetta & Larry The Tin Angel 1954
  Cisco Houston Hard Travellin 1954
  Homer and Jethro "Barefoot Ballads" 1957
  Jimmy Rogers 1960
  Odetta At the Town Hall  1963
  Rolf Harris Man With The Microphone  1966
  Alex Campbell Way Out west 1967
  Johnny Cash "Country & Western Classics" 1982
  The Wakami Wailers River Through the Pines 1999
  Oscar Brand
The first verse or the first two verses were sometimes played as a snippet during instrument tuning breaks by the Grateful Dead in concert mainly in 1970.  It was usually sung by Bob Weir and Phil Lesh.

Cinema
An animated version is available as The Frozen Logger 1963 directed by Gene Deitch

Published
 Bunk Shanty Ballads and Tales, James Stevens, Oregon Historical Quarterly, volume 50, number 4.  December 1949.
 Rise Up Singing 1988 page 137

Parody
The Frozen Jogger.

References

American folk songs
1928 songs
Logging in the United States